The 1998 World Weightlifting Championships were held in Lahti, Finland from November 7 to November 15. The women's competition in the flyweight (48 kg) division was staged on 10 November 1998.

Medalists

Records

Results

References
Results
Weightlifting World Championships Seniors Statistics, Page 12 

1998 World Weightlifting Championships
World